Bernard Bernstein (March 16, 1899 – October 24, 1963), was a male English international table tennis player.

He won a bronze medal at the 1926 World Table Tennis Championships in the men's  team event.

In addition to table tennis, Bernard Bernstein also played billiards.

See also
 List of England players at the World Team Table Tennis Championships
 List of World Table Tennis Championships medalists

References

1899 births
1963 deaths
World Table Tennis Championships medalists
English male table tennis players